The discography of Ghost, a Swedish rock band, consists of five studio albums, one live album, three extended plays (EPs), thirteen singles and fourteen music videos. Formed in Linköping in 2008, Ghost (formerly known as Ghost B.C. in the US) is composed of nine anonymous members – vocalist Papa Emeritus (revealed in 2017 to be Tobias Forge; all of the band's other frontmen are Forge under a different persona) and eight instrumentalists known as "Nameless Ghouls" (each representing one of the classical elements Fire, Water, Wind, Earth and Ether). After a self-issued demo, the band released its full-length debut Opus Eponymous on Rise Above Records in October 2010, which reached number 30 on the Swedish Albums Chart. "Elizabeth" was released as the sole single from the album in June.

In January 2013 the band returned with new frontman Papa Emeritus II, and in April the band released its second album Infestissumam. The album topped the Swedish Albums Chart, as well as reaching the top ten in Finland and Norway. In October 2014, the album was certified gold by the International Federation of the Phonographic Industry (IFPI) in Sweden, certifying sales of over 20,000 copies in the band's home country. Infestissumam lead single "Secular Haze" reached number 22 on the Finnish Singles Chart. The band released If You Have Ghost, a five-track EP of cover versions, in November 2013, which reached number 87 on the US Billboard 200.

Papa Emeritus III replaced II in May 2015, when the band released the single "Cirice" followed by "From the Pinnacle to the Pit" in July, both of which reached the top five of the US Billboard Mainstream Rock Songs chart. Ghost's third album Meliora was released in August, topping the albums charts in Sweden and Finland, and receiving a platinum certification in Sweden. A second EP, Popestar, featuring new original song "Square Hammer" and four covers, was released in September 2016. It became the first EP to top the Billboard Top Rock Albums chart since the chart began in 2006, while "Square Hammer" reached number 1 on the US Mainstream Rock chart.

Ghost released their fourth album Prequelle on 1 June 2018, which is the first to feature new frontman Cardinal Copia, and was preceded by the singles "Rats" and "Dance Macabre" in April.

On 13 September 2019, Ghost released Seven Inches of Satanic Panic, which has been described as a two-track EP and as a single. The day before, on 12 September, they released a video for the recording's A-side, "Kiss the Go-Goat", as part of their ongoing webseries.

Studio albums

Live albums

Extended plays

Compilation albums

Singles

Other charted and certified songs

Music videos

Footnotes

References

External links
Ghost official website
Ghost discography at AllMusic
Ghost discography at Discogs
Ghost discography at MusicBrainz

Discographies of Swedish artists
Heavy metal group discographies
Rock music group discographies